Zbigniew Czaja is a former Polish slalom canoeist who competed from the mid-1970s to the mid-1980s.

He won two medals in the C-2 team event at the ICF Canoe Slalom World Championships with a gold in 1979 and a silver in 1981.

References
 Overview of athlete's results at canoeslalom.net

Living people
Polish male canoeists
Year of birth missing (living people)
Place of birth missing (living people)
Medalists at the ICF Canoe Slalom World Championships
20th-century Polish people